Willem Louis Joseph Boost (2 July 1918, in Breda – 1 August 2005, in Breukelen), was a Dutch cartoonist, using the alias WiBo.

Boost (pronounced "boast") started his career as a drawing teacher, and then started to work for the Toonder studios. He worked for several journals and newspapers, including Jeugdkampioen, Het Lichtspoor, Mandril, Haagse Post (1952-1955), and Studio (1963-1965). He also worked for Dutch national newspaper de Volkskrant from 1951 until 1985, where he made a daily cartoon for the front page for many years.

External links
Obituary of WiBo (in Dutch)
Wibo in Comiclopedia

1918 births
2005 deaths
Dutch cartoonists
People from Breda